Héctor Fabián Aguilar Figueras (born 16 April 1984 in Maldonado) is a Uruguayan cyclist, who is currently suspended from the sport after testing positive for clenbuterol.

Major results

2005
 1st Stage 2 Rutas de América
 1st Stage 9 Vuelta del Uruguay
2006
 1st Stage 2 Rutas de América
 Tour do Brasil
1st Points classification
1st Stages 1, 4 & 5
 3rd Copa América de Ciclismo
2007
 1st Stage 4a Vuelta del Uruguay
2009
 Tour do Brasil
1st Stages 1 & 8
 6th Prova Ciclística 9 de Julho
2010
 Vuelta del Uruguay
1st Stages 6 & 7
 1st Stage 2 Tour do Brasil
 5th Prova Ciclística 9 de Julho
2011
 1st Stage 7 Tour de San Luis
 1st Stage 2 Vuelta Ciclista de Chile
 1st Stage 6 Rutas de América
2012
 1st Stage 1 Vuelta Mexico Telmex
 1st Stage 3 Vuelta del Uruguay
 2nd Prova Ciclística 9 de Julho
 3rd Road race, Pan American Road Championships
2013
 1st Stage 8 Rutas de América
 Vuelta del Uruguay
1st Stages 4, 6 & 8
2014
 1st Overall Rutas de América
1st Stage 6
2015
 1st Stage 1 Rutas de América
 1st Stage 7 Vuelta del Uruguay
2016
 1st Overall Rutas de América
1st Stages 1, 5a & 6
 Vuelta del Uruguay
1st Points classification
1st Stages 1, 3a (TTT), 3b & 6
2018
 Vuelta del Uruguay
1st Stages 5 & 8b

References

External links

1984 births
Living people
Uruguayan male cyclists
People from Maldonado, Uruguay